Bancroft is an unincorporated census-designated place in Portage County, Wisconsin, United States. As of the 2010 census, its population is 535. It is included in the Stevens Point, Wisconsin Micropolitan Statistical Area.

History
Bancroft was named for Warren Gamaliel Bancroft, who served in the 42nd Wisconsin Regiment during the American Civil War and later served as pastor of the Oshkosh Methodist Church. Bancroft was the name sake of Warren Gamaliel Bancroft Winnipeg Harding, who is better known as Warren G. Harding—the 29th president of the United States. A post office in the community was opened on May 17, 1876.

Geography
Bancroft is located in central Wisconsin approximately 10 miles south of Plover and approximately five miles north of Plainfield. Bancroft rests on Portage County Road W just to the east of Interstate 39 / U.S. Highway 51, at exit 143. (Lat: 44° 18' 35.0", Lon: -89° 30' 49.7"). Bancroft is the seat for the Town of Pine Grove.

The geography of Bancroft is mostly flat. There are, however, two interesting bluffs that rise prominently above the otherwise level plains. One was a large bluff, commonly referred to as Mosquito Bluff, that runs in an East-West direction. Mosquito Bluff is now separated into two large hills by Harding Road. 

The other prominent feature is known as The Ledge, which runs towards the North-East and is visible from I-39. This Bluff has gone by many names (Lover's Leap, Hellfire Hill, High Rock, Gulliver's Stool) but is most commonly known as The Ledge. At the top of The Ledge is an ichnite rock that has preserved traces of the passage of Climactichnites.

Notes

Census-designated places in Wisconsin
Census-designated places in Portage County, Wisconsin